The 1998–99 season was Birmingham City Football Club's 96th in the Football League. They finished in fourth place in the Football League First Division, qualifying for the promotion play-offs, in which they were eliminated in the semi-final by Watford in a penalty shootout. Birmingham lost to Leicester City in the third round of the FA Cup and to Wimbledon in the third round of the Football League Cup.

Football League First Division

Match details

League table (part)

Results summary

Play-offs

FA Cup

League Cup

Transfers

In

Out

Loan in

Appearances and goals

Numbers in parentheses denote appearances as substitute.
Players with squad numbers struck through and marked  left the club during the playing season.
Players with names in italics and marked * were on loan from another club for the whole of their season with Birmingham.

See also
 List of Birmingham City F.C. seasons

References
General
 
 
 Source for match dates, league positions and results: 
 Source for lineups, appearances, goalscorers and attendances: Matthews (2010), Complete Record, pp. 432–33.
 Source for goal times: 
 Source for transfers: 
 Source for discipline: individual player pages linked from 

Specific

Birmingham City F.C. seasons
Birmingham City